The Men's 800 metres at the 2014 Commonwealth Games, as part of the athletics programme, was held at Hampden Park between 29 and 31 July 2014. The event was won by Olympic silver-medallist, Nijel Amos, who beat Olympic champion and World record holder, David Rudisha.

Results

Heats

Heat 1

Heat 2

Heat 3

Heat 4

Semi-finals

Semi-final 1

Semi-final 2

Final

References

Men's 800 metres
2014